Kumeleh (also Romanized as Kūmeleh, Koomleh, Kowmleh, and Kvomleh) is a city and capital of Kumeleh District, in Langarud County, Gilan Province, Iran.  At the 2006 census, its population was 5,703, in 1,636 families.

References

Populated places in Langarud County

Cities in Gilan Province